Charles Willott (2 October 1904 – 18 June 1973) was a British sports shooter. He competed in the 25 m pistol event at the 1948 Summer Olympics.

References

1904 births
1973 deaths
British male sport shooters
Olympic shooters of Great Britain
Shooters at the 1948 Summer Olympics
People from Chorlton-cum-Hardy
Sportspeople from Manchester